Janna Beth Oetting (born 1964) is a researcher and speech-language pathologist specializing in the cross-dialectal study of childhood language development and developmental language disorders.

Education 
Oetting received a BA in Speech-Language Pathology from Augustana College in 1986. In 1988, Oetting completed an MA in Speech-Language Pathology, at the University of Kansas. She earned her Ph.D. in Child Language from the same university in 1992 under the supervision of Mabel Rice. Oetting’s dissertation, “Language-impaired and normally developing children's acquisition of English plural,” examined the plural systems of children with and without specific language impairment and showed evidence of dualistic representation of this grammar structure in both groups, even though the children with SLI showed limited productivity of regular plural marking.

Career and research 
Oetting is the Professor in the Department of Communication Sciences and Disorders at Louisiana State University. She directs the D4 Child Language Lab, which supports research on language Development and Disorders across Dialects of English to reduce Disparities in health and education among children.

Oetting’s research largely focuses on understanding the nature of childhood language disorders within various dialects of English, including African American English, Southern White English, and Cajun English; this work has been funded by grants from the National Institute of Health.

Oetting was the Editor of Language for the Journal of Speech, Language, and Hearing Research between 2010-2012.

In 2015, she represented Louisiana State University during a hearing about the conduct and language of Teresa Buchanan.

Honours and awards 
Oetting was inducted as a Fellow of the American Speech-Language-Hearing Association in 2005. She was inducted as Fellow of the Louisiana Speech-Language-Hearing Association in 2005, received Honors and the Jeannette-Laguaite Award from this association in 2007 and 2008, and served as Vice-President and President of this association in 2001 and 2002.

Biography 
The first of four children, Janna Beth Oetting was born in 1964 in Seward, Nebraska, to Bob and Carol Oetting.

Selected publications 

 Oetting, J. B. & Hadley, P. (2017). Morphosyntax in child language disorders. In. R. G. Schwartz (Ed.). The Handbook of Child Language Disorders (2nd ed., pp. 365–391). New York, NY: Psychological Press.

 Oetting, J. B. (2019). Variability within varieties of language: Profiles of typicality and impairment. Selected Proceedings of the 7th Generative Approaches to Language Acquisition - North America Conference (pp. 59–82). Philadelphia, PA: John Benjamins.

References

External links 

 D4 Child Language Lab 
 
 Faculty Web Page at LSU

Louisiana State University faculty
Augustana College (Illinois) alumni
Linguists from the United States
Women linguists
1964 births
Living people
Fellows of the American Speech–Language–Hearing Association
21st-century American women scientists